Golf at the 2015 Games of the Small States of Europe was held at the Golfklúbbur Reykjavíkur, Reykjavík, Iceland from 3 to 6 June 2015.

Medalists

Medal table

Results 
Legend
DNS — Did not start
DSQ — Disqualified

Men's

Women's

References

External links

2015 in golf
2015 Games of the Small States of Europe
2015